The Sikorsky S-61L and S-61N  are civil variants of the SH-3 Sea King military helicopter. It was developed and produced by the American helicopter manufacturer Sikorsky Aircraft.

The commercial version of the Sea King was developed during the late 1950s. Two versions, the land-based S-61L and the amphibious S-61N, were created. The S-61L had an enlarged cabin and dispensed with some of the amphibious features, such as its float stabilizers, for greater payload capacity. It was considered attractive to utility operators, while the amphibious S-61N appealed to off-shore operators. The first models were delivered to customers during September 1961. By the turn of the century, they had become two of the most widely used airliner and oil rig support helicopters built.

Airliners were a key customer for the S-61L. Los Angeles Airways, New York Airways, and Chicago Helicopter Airways were among the first operators. However, operations in this sector proved troublesome, with profits elusive and service often subject to noise complaints and accidents. S-61s also saw service in the search and rescue (SAR) sector in various countries. Third-party companies have often converted individual airframes by shortening the fuselage to bolster its lift capacity. Governmental organizations have procured the S-61: the United States Department of State was a prominent operator of the type into the twenty-first century.

Design and development

Background
In September 1957, Sikorsky was awarded a United States Navy development contract for an amphibious anti-submarine warfare (ASW) helicopter capable of both detecting and attacking submarines. On 11 March 1959, the XHSS-2 Sea King prototype made its maiden flight. Production deliveries of the HSS-2 (later designated SH-3A) commenced during September 1961.

Sikorsky quickly decided to pursue development of a dedicated commercial model of the Sea King. In fact, two prime models were produced: the land-based S-61L and the amphibious S-61N. On 2 November 1961, the S-61L conducted its maiden flight; it was  longer than the HSS-2 to facilitate the carriage of a substantial payload of freight or passengers. Initial production S-61Ls were powered by two  GE CT58-110 turboshafts, the civil version of the T58. The S-61L features a modified landing gear that eliminated the float stabilisers.

On 7 August 1962, the S-61N performed its first flight. Being otherwise identical to the S-61L, this version is optimized for overwater operations, particularly oil rig support, by retaining the SH-3's floats. Both the S-61L and S-61N were subsequently updated to the Mk II standard, which was outfitted with more powerful CT58-140 engines that provided superior performance in hot and high conditions, along with incorporating measures to dampen vibration and various other refinements.

Further development

Additional civil models of the S-61 would soon be developed. The Payloader, a stripped-down version optimized for aerial crane work, was the third civil model of the S-61 produced. The Payloader features the fixed undercarriage of the S-61L, but with an empty weight almost  less than the standard S-61N.

Carson Helicopters was the first company to shorten a commercial S-61. The improved lift performance lent itself to utility operations, particularly in the construction market.

A unique version is the S-61 Shortsky, a conversion of S-61Ls and S-61Ns performed by Helipro International. VIH Logging was the launch customer for HeliPro's Shortsky, which performed its first flight during February 1996.

One modification for the S-61 is the Carson Composite Main Rotor Blade. These blades replace the original Sikorsky metal blades, which are prone to fatigue, and permit a modified aircraft to carry an additional  load, fly  faster and increase range .

During the 2000s, the S-61T modernisation emerged. This model includes composite main rotor blades, a modular wiring harness, and (optionally) a glass cockpit; these changes reportedly boost the helicopter's lift capability as well as increase its speed. During June 2010, the United States Department of State signed a purchase agreement for up to 110 modernized S-61Ts, which will perform both passenger and cargo transport missions in support of its worldwide operations.

Operational history 

The first civil operator to adopt the S-61 was Los Angeles Airways, which introduced the type to service on 11 March 1962. The company had reportedly bought them from Sikorsky at a unit price of $650,000 each. Sikorsky's foremost competitor for sales was Boeing Vertol with their Vertol 107 twin-rotor helicopter, which arrived on the market shortly after the S-61. While regarded as one of the most successful American scheduled helicopter airlines even by the 21st century, following several accidents involving its S-61s, Los Angeles Airways ceased operations in 1971.

Even prior to the receipt of approval from the Federal Aviation Administration (FAA), the S-61 had been purchased by a number of airliners, including Los Angeles Airways, New York Airways, and Chicago Helicopter Airways. It was promoted as being the first U.S. helicopter designed specifically as a commercial airliner. The S-61 seated 25 passengers and had an estimated direct operating cost of 8¢ per seat mile. The operating costs of civil helicopter were considered to be crucial, even prior to the S-61's introduction, as airlines had typically been unable to achieve profitable helicopter routes and became dependent on government subsidies to operate, reportedly due to the limited capacity and high operating expense of the available helicopters. It was hoped that the S-61 would be able to noticeably improve on economics compared to its predecessors.

New York Airways ordered an initial batch of ten S-61s to serve its helicopter routes. Perhaps most prominently, it started operated flights from a heliport on the 59-story Pan Am Building, and at one point planned to perform as many as 360 helicopter flights per day. Launched on 21 December 1965, the operation soon proved to be unprofitable, only carrying an average of only eight passengers, leading to the heliport's closure in 1968. While flights were resumed during February 1977, an accident three months later involving a S-61 helicopter that collapsed and flipped onto its side, killing five people, led to the heliport being closed indefinitely. Two years later, New York Airlines ended helicopter operations.

From 1962 to 1966, Pakistan International Airlines (PIA) operated its Sikorsky S-61 helicopters for services within East Pakistan Helicopter Service (present day Bangladesh) using four S-61s. The helicopter route to Khulna reduced the 21-hour journey overland to 37 minutes by air. 20 towns and cities covered by the network, including Bogra, Sirajganj, Chittagong, Mongla, Kushtia, Barisal, Chandpur, Sandwip and Hatiya Upazila. The average price of a ticket was 25 rupees. It was the world's largest commercial helicopter network at the time.

Between 1978 and 1986, a S-61 was used for an Airlink service between the London airports of Heathrow and Gatwick over a distance of 42 miles; it was operated jointly by British Caledonian Airways and British Airways Helicopters in partnership with the British Airports Authority (BAA). While the operation proved valuable prior to the opening of the M25 motorway, its noise led to it being a point of controversy, the route overflying several densely populated areas of London. Initially, the Civil Aviation Authority banned flights between 9.15pm and 6.30am to limit its impact, but the whole service came to an end after its licence to operate was revoked by the Transport Secretary on 6 February 1986. Numerous S-61s were also operated on other routes in Britain, often between the mainland and off-shore locations such as the Channel Islands, the Scilly Islands, and various oil rigs in the North Sea.

The British operator Bristow Helicopters operated a number of S-61s; they were used to perform search and rescue (SAR) operations from civilian bases at Stornoway, Sumburgh, Lee-on-Solent, and Portland between 1983 and 2007. Between 1991 and 2013, the Irish Coast Guard operated its own S-61s for SAR operations.

Various government organisations have also adopted the S-61. During the 2010s, the United States Department of State procured in excess of 100 S-61Ts in support of its worldwide operations. These rotorcraft have been operated in both Iraq and Afghanistan, amongst other locations.

Variants
S-61L  Non-amphibious civil transport version. It seats up to 30 passengers.
S-61L Mk II Improved version of the S-61L, cabin equipped with cargo bins.
  Amphibious civil transport version.
S-61N Mk II Improved version of the S-61N.
S-61NM An L model in an N configuration.
S-61T Triton modernized upgrade performed by Sikorsky and Carson Helicopters. Upgrades include composite main rotor blades, full airframe structural refurbishment, conversion of folding rotor head to non-folding, new modular wiring harness, and Cobham-supplied glass cockpit avionics. Initial models converted were S-61N.
AS-61N-1 Silver License-built model of the S-61N by Agusta, with a shortened cabin.

Operators

 Brunei Shell Petroleum

 CHC Helicopter
 Cougar Helicopters

 Air Greenland

 Bristow Helicopters

 Sociedad de Salvamento y Seguridad Marítima

 AAR Corp
 Carson Helicopters
 CHI Aviation
 Helimax Aviation 
 Croman Corporation
 Helicopter Transport Services 
 United States Department of State

Former operators

 Argentine Air Force

 Canadian Coast Guard
 Helijet

 Irish Air Corps
 Irish Coast Guard 

 Lebanese Air Force

KLM Helikopters

 Helikopter Service A/S

 Pakistan International Airlines

 British Airways Helicopters
 British Caledonian Helicopters
 British International Helicopters
 Her Majesty's Coastguard

 Los Angeles Airways
 New York Airways
 San Francisco and Oakland Helicopter Airlines

Notable accidents

1960s

 On 2 February 1966, Flight 17, operated by a Sikorsky S-61 helicopter registration AP-AOC, crashed on a scheduled domestic flight in Faridpur Division, East Pakistan after the main gearbox failed, killing 23 of the 24 passengers and crew on board.
 On 10 December 1966, operated by a Sikorsky S-61 helicopter registration AP-AOA, crashed on a scheduled domestic flight in Dhaka East Pakistan.
 On 22 May 1968, Los Angeles Airways Flight 841 crashed near Paramount, California, resulting in the loss of 23 lives. The accident aircraft, N303Y, serial number 61060, was a Sikorsky S-61L en route to Los Angeles International Airport from the Disneyland Heliport in Anaheim, California.
 On 14 August 1968, Los Angeles Airways Flight 417 crashed in Compton, California, while en route to the Disneyland Heliport in Anaheim, California from Los Angeles International Airport, resulting in the loss of 21 lives. The accident aircraft, N300Y, serial number 61031, was the prototype of the Sikorsky S-61L.

1970s

 On 25 October 1973, a Greenlandair S-61N, OY-HAI "Akigssek" ("Grouse") crashed about 40 km south of Nuuk, resulting in the loss of 15 lives. It was en route to Paamiut from Nuuk. The same aircraft had an emergency landing on the Kangerlussuaq fjord two years earlier, due to flameout on both engines because of ice in the intake.
 On 10 May 1974 KLM Helikopters S-61N PH-NZC crashed en route to an oil rig in the North Sea. None of the two crew and four passengers survived. The probable cause was a failure in one of five rotor blades due to metal fatigue. The resulting imbalance caused the motor mounts to fail and caused a fire. The uncontrollable aircraft landed hard in the water, capsized and sank. Investigation indicated that the metal fatigue crack must have spread rapidly in less than four hours. As a result of the accident it was recommended to shorten inspection intervals  The aircraft was recovered from the North Sea floor. It was rebuilt and currently flies as registration N87580 in the USA.
 On 16 May 1977, New York Airways' commercial S-61-L, N619PA, suffered a static rollover onto its starboard side at the heliport on top of the Pan Am Building while boarding passengers. The accident killed four boarding passengers and one woman on the street. 17 additional passengers and the three flight crew members were uninjured. The landing gear collapse was a result of metal fatigue in the helicopter's main landing gear shock-absorbing strut assembly, which caused the helicopter to tip over without warning. The accident resulted in the permanent closure of the Pan Am Building heliport. As the heliport was closed, the wreckage was removed by disassembling it and taking the assemblies down to street level using the building's freight elevators. The airframe was taken to Cape Town, South Africa, where it was rebuilt, certified and returned to service for the Ship-Service Role off the shores of the Western Cape by the company "Court Helicopter" which was later amalgamated with CHC.

1980s

 On 16 July 1983, British Airways Helicopters' commercial S-61 G-BEON crashed in the southern Celtic Sea, in the Atlantic Ocean, while en route from Penzance to St Mary's, Isles of Scilly in thick fog. Only six of the 26 on board survived. It sparked a review of helicopter safety and was the worst civilian helicopter disaster in the UK until 1986.
 On 20 March 1985, an Okanagan Helicopters S-61N (C-GOKZ) ditched in the Atlantic Ocean off Owls Head, Nova Scotia. The aircraft was en route from the MODU Sedco 709 offshore Nova Scotia to the Halifax International Airport (YHZ)when the main gearbox suffered a total loss of transmission fluid. There were 15 passengers and two crew on board. There were no injuries during the ditching, however several passengers suffered varying degrees of hypothermia. As a result of this incident, improved thermal protection and other advancements in helicopter transportation suits were instituted for offshore workers on Canada's east coast.
 On 12 July 1988, a British International Helicopters S-61N ditched into the North Sea, no injuries.

1990s

On 25 July 1990, a British International Helicopters Sikorsky S-61 registration 'G-BEWL' from Sumburgh Airport crashed onto the Brent Spar oil storage platform as the pilots were attempting to land. The aircraft fell into the North Sea, where six of the 13 passengers and crew on board died.

2000s

On 8 July 2006, a Sociedad de Salvamento y Seguridad Marítima S-61N Mk.II search and rescue helicopter, crashed into the Atlantic Ocean while it was flying from Tenerife to La Palma. There were no survivors among the six people on board.
 On 5 August 2008, two pilots and seven firefighters assigned to the Iron Complex fire in California's Shasta–Trinity National Forest, were killed when Carson Helicopters S-61N N612AZ crashed on takeoff. Of the 13 people reportedly on board, one other pilot and three firefighters survived the crash with serious or critical injuries. The NTSB determined that the probable causes were the following actions by Carson Helicopters: 1) the intentional understatement of the helicopter's empty weight, 2) the alteration of the power available chart to exaggerate lift capability, and 3) the use of unapproved above-minimum specification torque in performance calculations that, collectively, resulted in the pilots’ relying on performance calculations that significantly overestimated load-carrying capacity and without an adequate performance margin for a successful takeoff; and insufficient oversight by the U.S. Forest Service and the Federal Aviation Administration. Contributing factors were the flight crew's failure to address the fact that the helicopter had approached its maximum performance capability on two prior departures from the accident site as they were accustomed to operating at its performance limit. Contributing to the fatalities were the immediate, intense fire due to a fuel spillage upon impact from the fuel tanks that were not crash-resistant, the separation from the floor of the cabin seats that were not crash-resistant, and the use of an inappropriate release mechanism on the seat restraints.

2020s

 On 22 February 2022, an S-61N being flown by Croman Corporation in support of a training operation, crashed and killed the four occupants, at the Pacific Missile Range Facility on the Hawaiian island of Kauai.Four die in Hawaii crash of contractor’s helicopter, Navy says Audrey McAvoy and Jennifer Sinco Kelleher, The Associated Press 2022-02-23

Specifications (S-61N Mk II)

See also

References

Citations

Bibliography

External links

 Canadian Coast Guard S-61N Characteristics page
 S-61N Specs & Photo on flugzeuginfo.net
 HELIS.com Sikorsky S-61/H-3/HSS-2 Database

1950s United States helicopters
Search and rescue helicopters
1950s United States civil utility aircraft
Amphibious helicopters
S-061
Twin-turbine helicopters
Aircraft first flown in 1959